Fort Chipewyan , commonly referred to as Fort Chip, is a hamlet in northern Alberta, Canada, within the Regional Municipality (RM) of Wood Buffalo.

History

Fort Chipewyan is one of the oldest European settlements in the Province of Alberta. It was established as a trading post by Peter Pond of the North West Company in 1788. The fort was named after the Chipewyan people living in the area.

One of the establishers of the fort, Roderick Mackenzie of Terrebonne, always had a taste for literature, as was seen years later when he opened correspondence with traders all over the north and west, asking for descriptions of scenery, adventure, folklore and history. He also had in view the founding of a library at the fort, which would not be only for the immediate residents of Fort Chipewyan, but for traders and clerks of the whole region tributary to Lake Athabasca, so that it would be what he called, in an imaginative and somewhat jocular vein, "the little Athens of the Arctic regions." This library, built in 1790, held over 2000 books, and became one of the most famous in the whole extent of Rupert's Land.

From about 1815 to 1821 the Hudson's Bay Company (HBC) maintained a competing Fort Wedderburn (named after Andrew Colvile's family) on Coal Island  from the North West Company's fort. This fort was established by John Clarke, and Sir George Simpson arrived here in 1820–1821, where he began to reorganize the fur trade.

Sir John Franklin set out from Fort Chipewyan on his overland Arctic journey on 1820. In 1887–1888 there was a great famine. Electric lights did not arrive in Fort Chipewyan until 1959.

Historic sites 
Old Fort Point, the site of the first Fort Chipewyan established in 1788 by Roderick Mackenzie, southeast of Fort Chipewyan was designated a National Historic Site of Canada in 1930. Historic places in the community include the site of the third Fort Chipewyan established in 1803, the Anglican Church built in 1880 and Day School built in 1874, and the Roman Catholic Mission Church built in 1909.

Climate 
Fort Chipewyan has a subarctic climate (Köppen Dfc) with long, very cold, dry winters and short, warm, wetter summers.

Demographics 

The population of Fort Chipewyan according to the 2018 municipal census conducted by the Regional Municipality of Wood Buffalo is 918, a decrease from its 2012 municipal census population count of 1,008.

The hamlet's population is predominantly made up of Cree and Chipewyan (Dene) First Nations and Métis people.

Transportation

Air 
The hamlet is served by the Fort Chipewyan Airport, opened on June 18, 1966. Air is one of two methods of access to Fort Chipewyan in the summer.

Water 
In the summer, the hamlet also can be accessed by boat  from Fort McMurray via the Athabasca River.

Road 
There are no all-weather roads to Fort Chipewyan, but it can be reached via winter roads in the winter. These include roads from Fort Smith to the north and from Fort McMurray to the south. In June 1998, and as part of the Northwestern Canadian Integrated Road Network Plan, the Alberta government conducted studies on all-weather road access by extending the existing Highway 63 from Fort McMurray. As of 2008 Highway 63 has been extended from Fort McMurray to Syncrude; there are currently no plans on extending it further to Fort Chipewyan. In December 2005, one-third of Fort Chipewyan's residents signed a petition to request the government to build a  all-weather road to connect with existing roads to the northwest that provide access to Fort Smith, Northwest Territories. The major expenditure would be a bridge over the Slave River.

Solar energy
In September 2014, the community of Fort Chipewyan in collaboration with Keepers of the Athabasca installed a 1.8 kW solar array on the roof of the Elder Lodge to be used for emergency backup power. An energy baseline study was completed for Fort Chipewyan by the Pembina Institute in 2012.

The table below shows the mean daily global insolation (kWh/m2) in Fort Chipewyan for each month of the year using five different fixed solar array orientations and one which tracks the sun. The data was provided by Natural Resources Canada's Municipality database of photovoltaic potential and insolation  which used data collected over 50 years from 144 locations compiled from Environment Canada's CERES CD.

Fort Chipewyan Solar Farm
The Fort Chipewyan Solar Farm was developed by Three Nations Energy LP, and constructed in 2019 through 2020. ATCO was the designer and builder, and operates the system. The Athabasca Chipewyan First Nation, Mikisew Cree First Nation, and Fort Chipewyan Métis Local 125 own the project. The solar farm is expected to supply approximately 25 percent of Fort Chipewyan's energy and annually replace 800,000 litres of diesel fuel. A battery storage system will store 1.5 MWh of power.

Phase 1 was planned to include 1,500 panels (400 kW) but was reported at the project completion as a 600 kW facility, while phase 2 was planned include 6,000 panels and was reported at the project completion to include 5,760 panels with the planned output of 2,200 kW. The Government of Canada provided $4.5M and the Government of Alberta provided $3.3M of the project's $7.8M cost.

ATCO will buy the solar farm's energy under a long-term purchase agreement and supply it to the local power grid, which is disconnected from the province-wide grid. ATCO stated that with the completion of the 2.2 MW-capacity project, about 25 fewer tanker trucks will trek across the winter ice road connecting the community with Fort McMurray, 220 kilometres to the south. In the summer, the community is only accessible by air or barge.

See also 
List of communities in Alberta
List of designated places in Alberta
List of hamlets in Alberta

References

Notes

External links

Hamlets in Alberta
National Historic Sites in Alberta
North West Company forts
Designated places in Alberta
Regional Municipality of Wood Buffalo
Hudson's Bay Company forts
Forts or trading posts on the National Historic Sites of Canada register
1788 establishments in the British Empire
Lake Athabasca